Deborah Ruth Malac (born 1955) is an American diplomat, who served as the United States Ambassador to Uganda. She was nominated by President Barack Obama and was confirmed by the Senate Nov. 19, 2015. She previously served as United States Ambassador to Liberia.

Early life and education
Malac is the daughter of Marian Bartak Malac and Barry Forrest Malac, a Czech immigrant. In 1977 Malac earned a B.A. in international studies magna cum laude and Phi Beta Kappa from Furman University. She also received an M.A. in foreign affairs from the University of Virginia in 1981. She later studied at the Industrial College of the Armed Forces (now Dwight D. Eisenhower School for National Security and Resource Strategy) and received an M.S. in national resources strategy there in 2002. Malac spent a year studying international law at the University of Basel on a Fulbright Foundation fellowship.

Career
Malac joined the Department of State in 1981. She has spent most of her career focusing on Africa. Her assignments included serving as desk officer for Laos and South Africa. Overseas assignments brought her to Bangkok, Pretoria, and Yaoundé, Cameroon, Senegal and Ethiopia.

In 2012 Malac became to U.S. Ambassador to Liberia. In 2014, a major Ebola outbreak started there, and Malac helped coordinate the U.S. response to the medical and humanitarian crisis. Liberia's President, Ellen Johnson Sirleaf, joined Malac in a tour of the Liberian capital and implored U.S. President Barack Obama to assist the country. When aid was forthcoming, Malac assured Liberians that American military assistance (which became Operation United Assistance) were not there to organize a coup against Ellen Johnson-Sirleaf.  Malac later noted that coordinated efforts helped to curb the epidemic.

On September 19, 2015 President Obama nominated Malac to become the U.S Ambassador to Uganda to replace Scott DeLisi, who announced he was retiring. The Senate confirmed the nomination in November 2015. When elections took place shortly after her arrival, the government of Uganda issued statements critical of Malac for her admonition not to sacrifice democratic processes in the country for the sake of security. Her mission terminated on January 26, 2020.

Personal life
In addition to English, Malac speaks French, German and Thai. Malac and her husband, Ron Olson, have three children.

References

External links

https://www.africanews.com/2020/01/25/ugandans-must-talk-about-transition-outgoing-us-ambassador/ - Malac says on returning home that Uganda needs to have a discussion about future transition, January 2020.

1955 births
Living people
Ambassadors of the United States to Liberia
Ambassadors of the United States to Uganda
American people of Czech descent
Furman University alumni
Dwight D. Eisenhower School for National Security and Resource Strategy alumni
Obama administration personnel
University of Virginia alumni
United States Foreign Service personnel
21st-century American diplomats
American women ambassadors
21st-century American women